Donatas Navikas (born 30 June 1983) is a former Lithuanian footballer who has recently started coaching career. He is currently coaching FK Neptūnas.

Navikas previously played for FC Salyut-Energia Belgorod in the Russian First Division.

Coaching career
Following a 9–1 defeat against FK Sūduva in the beginning of November 2019, head coach Viktors Dobrecovs was fired and Navikas - who at the time was assistant coach to Dobrecovs - was appointed as FK Atlantas coach on temporary basis until the end of the year. Navikas lost all four games in charge and left the club at the end of the year.

In January 2020 Navikas took up an offer to coach newly established football club FK Neptūnas, where he also was registered as a player.

References

External links
 
 

1983 births
Living people
People from Ukmergė
Lithuanian footballers
Lithuanian expatriate footballers
Lithuanian expatriate sportspeople in Russia
Lithuanian expatriate sportspeople in Belarus
Expatriate footballers in Russia
Expatriate footballers in Belarus
A Lyga players
Belarusian Premier League players
FK Inkaras Kaunas players
FK Atlantas players
FC Salyut Belgorod players
FK Šilutė players
FC Minsk players
FC Slavia Mozyr players
FK Palanga players
Association football midfielders
Lithuanian football managers
A Lyga managers